The 2001 Marshall Thundering Herd football team represented Marshall University in the 2001 NCAA Division I-A football season. The Thundering Herd played their home games at Marshall University Stadium in Huntington, West Virginia, and competed in the East Division of the Mid-American Conference (MAC). The team was coached by sixth-year head coach Bob Pruett. Marshall finished the season with a 64–61 win over  East Carolina in the GMAC Bowl.  It was the highest scoring bowl game in college football history.

Schedule

The game between Marshall and TCU was canceled due to the September 11 attacks.

Roster

Team players drafted in the NFL
The following players were selected in the 2002 NFL Draft.

References

Marshall
Marshall Thundering Herd football seasons
LendingTree Bowl champion seasons
Marshall Thundering Herd football